Renard Island is an island, approximately  long and  wide, with Cape Renard at its northern end and separated from False Cape Renard by a channel that appeared following the loss of ice prior to 2001.  It was named by the UK Antarctic Place-names Committee in 2008 in association with Cape Renard.

Maps
 Antarctic Digital Database (ADD). Scale 1:250000 topographic map of Antarctica. Scientific Committee on Antarctic Research (SCAR). Since 1993, regularly upgraded and updated.

References

Danco Coast